Hyposidra apioleuca is a geometer moth in the Ennominae subfamily. It is found in Peninsular Malaysia, Sumatra, and Borneo. The species prefers lower montane forests at 1000-1200m, but has been collected as low as 500m and at 1930m.

References

External links
The Moths of Borneo

Boarmiini
Ennominae
Moths of Borneo
Moths of Malaysia
Moths described in 1916